The 2004 Rhode Island Democratic presidential primary was held on March 2 in the U.S. state of Rhode Island as one of the Democratic Party's statewide nomination contests ahead of the 2004 presidential election.

Results

References 

Rhode Island
Democratic primary
2004